The 14th constituency of Budapest is one of the single member constituencies of the National Assembly, the national legislature of Hungary. The constituency standard abbreviation: Budapest 14. OEVK.

Since 2014, it has been represented by Mónika Dunai of the Fidesz–KDNP party alliance.

Geography
The 14th constituency is located in eastern part of Pest.

List of districts
The constituency includes the following municipalities:

 District XVII.: Full part of the district.
 District X.: Eastern part (Újhegy and Keresztúridűlő) of the district.

Members
The constituency was first represented by Mónika Dunai of the Fidesz from 2014, and she was re-elected in 2018 and 2022.

References

Budapest 14th